Cecil Colman (1884 – 17 January 1935) was a South African cricketer. He played in seven first-class matches from 1910/11 to 1912/13.

References

External links
 

1884 births
1935 deaths
South African cricketers
Eastern Province cricketers
Free State cricketers
Cricketers from Cape Town